Ipswich Tramway operated a horse-drawn tramway service in Ipswich between 1880 and 1903.

History

Ipswich's horse tramway started services on 13 October 1880 from a depot located at the junction of Quadling Street and New Cardinal Street. It was operated and owned by S A Graham. The line ran from Cornhill in the town centre, via Princes Street, to Ipswich railway station. There was a branch line to Brooks Hall, via Portman Road and Norwich Road.

The Ipswich Tramway Company took ownership in 1881, under the Ipswich Tramways Act of 1881. An extension to the system was constructed between Cornhill and Brooks Hall, via Westgate Street and St Matthews Street. In 1884 there was a further extension from Cornhill to Derby Road railway station.

Closure

The company was bought by Ipswich Corporation on 1 November 1901 who modernised and electrified the service and it continued as Ipswich Corporation Tramways.

References

Tram transport in England
Transport in Ipswich
3 ft 6 in gauge railways in England